Epicampocera is a genus of flies in the family Tachinidae.

Species
Epicampocera succincta (Meigen, 1824)

References

Diptera of Europe
Diptera of Asia
Exoristinae
Monotypic Brachycera genera
Tachinidae genera
Taxa named by Pierre-Justin-Marie Macquart